Ashot Sureni Khachatryan (born 3 August 1959) is a retired football defender from Armenia. He obtained a total number of five caps for the national team. Khachatryan made his debut on 14 October 1992 against Moldova (0–0).

External links
 
 Ashot Khachatryan at Armfootball.tripod.com

1959 births
Living people
Armenia international footballers
Armenian footballers
Armenian expatriate footballers
Association football defenders
Soviet Armenians
Soviet footballers
Soviet Top League players
FC Ararat Yerevan players
ASA Issy players
FC Yerevan managers
Armenian football managers
Expatriate footballers in France
Armenian expatriate sportspeople in France